Redbird Wins is a 1914 American silent short drama film directed by Sydney Ayres, starring Harry von Meter, Vivian Rich, Perry Banks and William Garwood.

Cast
 Harry von Meter as Colonel James Dinwidty
 Vivian Rich as Fern, his daughter
 Perry Banks as Tom, the butler
 Reaves Eason as Ray Connors
 William Garwood as Philip Pierpont
 Louise Lester as Negro mammy
 Jack Richardson

External links

1914 films
1914 drama films
Silent American drama films
American silent short films
American black-and-white films
1914 short films
Films directed by Sydney Ayres
1910s American films
1910s English-language films
American drama short films